Water Corporation is the principal supplier of water, wastewater and drainage services throughout the state of Western Australia. It is the seventh successive agency to deal with the services in Perth, Western Australia.

With offices in Perth, Bunbury, Albany, Karratha, Geraldton, Northam and Kalgoorlie, Water Corporation's services, projects and activities span 2.6 million square kilometres.

Water Corporation employs over 2,746 people and manages an asset base over $37 billion (AUD) in water supply, wastewater, drainage infrastructure and bulk water for irrigation.

Water Corporation is owned by the Western Australian Government and is accountable to its sole shareholder, the Minister for Water. Most of Water Corporation's surplus is returned to the Government as a dividend to contribute to the development of the state, with the remainder invested in capital works.

Formation 
Water Corporation was created in January 1996, in a restructure of the water industry in Western Australia.

The Water Authority in turn had been created in 1985 through a merger of the former Metropolitan Water Authority, which operated in Perth, the state capital, and the water and wastewater operations of the former WA Public Works Department.

Earlier agency names 
  Metropolitan Water Works Board 1 October 1896       –       1 April 1909	
  Metropolitan Board of Water Supply and Sewerage	1 Apr 1909	–        1 January 1910	
  Metropolitan Water Supply, Sewerage and Drainage Department	1 Jan 1910 –    1 July 1964	
  Water Supply, Sewerage and Drainage Department	1 Jan 1912	 –       1 January 1921	
  Metropolitan Water Supply Sewerage and Drainage Board	1 Jul 1964  –	1 Jul 1982	
  Metropolitan Water Authority 	                1 July 1982       –       1 July 1985
  Water Authority of Western Australia                 1 July 1985    –    1 January 1996
  Water Corporation 	                                1 January 1996  –

Operations 
During 2017-2018 year, Water Corporation:

 Delivered water services to 1,001,362 properties
 Supplied 363 gigalitres (billion litres) of water
 Collected 164 gigalitres of wastewater
 Managed 34,678 kilometres of water mains, 17,051 kilometres of sewer mains and 2,547 kilometres of drains

Main water supply schemes 
The Integrated Water Supply System (IWSS) delivers 363 billion litres of water each year to over 1.5 million people in Perth, the Goldfields and Agricultural region and some parts of the southwest. It is the largest scheme managed by Water Corporation, and in 2017-18 water supplied into the IWSS came from the following sources:

 10% surface water (from our dams – this water can also contain a proportion of water that originated from groundwater or desalination, as we bank water from these sources in our dams).
 2% groundwater replenishment
 40% groundwater
 48% desalinated seawater.

Wastewater systems 
Water Corporation operates 112 wastewater treatment plants across Western Australia. Approximately 80% of the wastewater collected and treated throughout the state occurs in the Perth metropolitan area at Water Corporation's three largest wastewater treatment plants at Woodman Point, Beenyup and Subiaco. Two other large capacity wastewater treatment plants are being developed to support Perth's expanding population:

North of Perth is the Alkimos Wastewater Treatment Plant, which began operation in 2011. It will be expanded over time to reach a capacity of 160 million litres a day.
The East Rockingham Wastewater Treatment Plant opened its doors in February 2016. It currently treats 20 million litres per day, and will expand to treat 150 million litres per day from 2015.

Water Corporation uses 100% of produced biosolids in the metropolitan area for a range of purposes including agricultural and forestry.

Irrigation 
Water Corporation provides more than 5,234 megalitres per year of bulk water supplies to irrigation schemes operated by farmer cooperatives in the northwest (Ord Irrigation District), midwest (Gascoyne Irrigation District) and southwest (South West and Preston Valley Irrigation Districts).

Drainage 
Water Corporation manages main drainage systems in Perth and some regional areas to prevent flooding and optimise land usage while minimising impacts on property and protecting the natural environment. These services involve about 1,420 kilometres of rural main drains and more than 1,126 kilometres of drains in the Perth metropolitan area. Local councils manage most of Perth's smaller reticulation drains. Corporation drainage services benefit 320,000 hectares of agricultural land in parts of the South West and Albany on the south coast.

Planning for the future 
To ensure water services for a state that is growing rapidly yet at the same time suffering reduced rainfall, Water Corporation plans well ahead on multiple fronts. It aims to reduce water use and increase wastewater recycling while developing new water sources with a strong focus on those that are independent of climate. At the same time, it aims to reduce environmental impact from its operations.

In October 2009, Water Corporation released its 50-year plan, Water Forever: Towards Climate Resilience, which provides a portfolio of options to manage demand and supply balance by 2060 through:

Reducing water use by 25% 
Increasing water recycling to 60% 
Developing up to 100 billion litres of new water sources

References

External links 
 Department of Water
 

Government-owned companies of Western Australia
Water companies of Australia
Water supply and sanitation in Western Australia
Australian companies established in 1996